Amanda Flower (born January 23, 1980, in Akron, Ohio) is a USA Today bestselling American writer of mystery novels under her real name and the pen name, "Isabella Alan". She writes for adults and children. She won the Agatha Award for Children's/Young Adult book in 2015 for Andi Unstoppable, and was nominated for an Agatha Award in 2010 (Maid of Murder), 2013 (Andi Unexpected), and 2014 (Andi Under Pressure).

Bibliography

As Amanda Flower

India Hayes series
Maid of Murder, Five Star Publishing, 2010
Murder in a Basket, Five Star Publishing, 2012

Amish Candy Shop series

 Assaulted Caramel, Kensington Publishing, 2017
 Lethal Licorice, Kensington Publishing, 2018
 Premediated Peppermint, Kensington Publishing, 2018
 Criminally Cocoa, Kensington Publishing, 2019
 Toxic Toffee, Kensington Publishing, 2019

Amish Matchmaker series

 Matchmaking Can Be Murder, Kensington Publishing, 2020

Appleseed Creek series
A Plain Death, B&H Publishing, 2012
A Plain Scandal, B&H Publishing, 2013
A Plain Disappearance, B&H Publishing, 2013
A Plain Malice, CreateSpace Independent Publishing Platform, 2014

Andi Boggs series
Andi Unexpected, Zonderkidz, 2013
Andi Under Pressure, Zonderkidz, 2014
Andi Unstoppable, Zonderkidz, 2015

Living History Museum series

 The Final Reveille, Midnight Ink, 2015
 The Final Tap, Midnight Ink, 2016
 The Final Vow, Midnight Ink, 2017

Magical Bookshop series

 Crime and Poetry, Penguin Random House, 2016
 Prose and Cons, Penguin Random House, 2016
 Murders and Metaphors, Crooked Lane Books, 2019
 Verse and Vengeance, Crooked Lane Books, 2019

Magic Garden series

 Flowers and Foul Play, Crooked Lane Books, 2018
 Death and Daisies,  Crooked Lane Books, 2019

As Isabella Alan

Amish Quilt Shop series

Plainly Murder, New American Library, 2013, prequel novella
Murder, Plain and Simple, New American Library, 2013
Murder, Simply Stitched, New American Library, 2014
Murder, Served Simply, New American Library, 2014
Murder, Plainly Read, New American Library, 2015
Murder, Handcrafted, New American Library, 2016

References

External links
Amanda Flower’s website
Stop Your Killing Me- Amanda Flower
Interview USA Today Happily Ever After
Amanda Flower: Mild-Mannered Librarian Plots Murder-- Publishers Weekly
USA Today Bestseller- Amanda Flower
https://www.cozy-mystery.com/amanda-flower.html
https://www.kensingtonbooks.com/author.aspx/31849
https://www.penguinrandomhouse.com/authors/308147/amanda-flower/

American women novelists
Living people
Novelists from Ohio
21st-century American novelists
21st-century American women writers
1980 births
Agatha Award winners
Writers from Akron, Ohio